Ficimia is a genus of colubrid snakes commonly known as hooknose snakes or hook-nosed snakes, which are endemic to North America. There are seven species within the genus.

Geographic range
Species of Ficimia are found in Mexico, in the United States in the southern tip of Texas, and as far south as Guatemala, Belize, and Honduras.

Description
Hooknose snakes are typically gray or olive green in color, with brown or black blotching down the back, and a cream-colored underside. The dorsal scales are smooth (keeled in Heterodon), and the anal plate is divided.

Diet
Hook-nosed snakes feed primarily on spiders and centipedes.

Species
The following seven species are recognized.

Ficimia hardyi Mendoza-Quijano & H.M. Smith, 1993 – Hardy's hook-nosed snake
Ficimia olivacea Gray, 1849 – Mexican hook-nosed snake
Ficimia publia Cope, 1866 – blotched hook-nosed snake
Ficimia ramirezi H.M. Smith & Langebartel, 1949 – Ramirez's hook-nosed snake
Ficimia ruspator H.M. Smith & Taylor, 1941 – Guerreran hook-nosed snake
Ficimia streckeri Taylor, 1941 – Strecker's hook-nosed snake
Ficimia variegata (Günther, 1858) – Tehuantepec hook-nosed snake

References

Further reading
Gray JE (1849). Catalogue of the Specimens of Snakes in the Collection of the British Museum. London: Trustees of the British Museum. (Edward Newman, printer.) xv + 125 pp. (Ficimia, new genus, p. 80).

External links
Herps of Texas: Ficimia streckeri

Colubrids
Snake genera
Taxa named by John Edward Gray